Maryborough is an electoral district of the Legislative Assembly in the Australian state of Queensland.

The district is centred on the regional city of Maryborough and takes in other surrounding communities.

History
In 1864, the Additional Members Act created six additional electoral districts, each returning 1 member:
 Clermont
 Kennedy
 Maryborough
 Mitchell
 Rockhampton
 Warrego

The first elections in these six electorates were held in 1865 (that is, during a parliamentary term and not as part of a general election across Queensland). The nomination date for the election in Maryborough was 30 January 1865 and the election was held on 1 February 1865.

Between 1878 and 1912, the district elected two members, and then returned only a single member to the present time (2014).

Members for Maryborough
The members for Maryborough were:

Election results

References

 Waterson, Duncan Bruce: Biographical Register of the Queensland Parliament 1860–1929 (second edition), Sydney 2001.
 Waterson, Duncan Bruce: Biographical register of the Queensland Parliament 1930–1980 w.an outline of Queensland electorates 1859–1980 / D.B. Waterson and John Arnold

External links
 

Electoral districts of Queensland
1865 establishments in Australia